A volcanic bomb or lava bomb is a mass of partially molten rock (tephra) larger than 64 mm (2.5 inches) in diameter, formed when a volcano ejects viscous fragments of lava during an eruption. Because volcanic bombs cool after they leave the volcano, they are extrusive igneous rocks. Volcanic bombs can be thrown many kilometres from an erupting vent, and often acquire aerodynamic shapes during their flight. Volcanic bombs are a significant volcanic hazard, and can cause severe injuries and death to people in an eruption zone. One such incident occurred at Galeras volcano in Colombia in 1993; six people near the summit were killed and several seriously injured by lava bombs when the volcano erupted unexpectedly. On July 16, 2018, 23 people were injured on a tour boat near the Kilauea volcano as a result of a basketball-sized lava bomb from the 2018 lower Puna eruption.

Volcanic bombs are known to occasionally explode from internal gas pressure as they cool, but in most cases, most of the damage they cause is from impact, or subsequent fire damage. Bomb explosions are most often observed in "bread-crust" type bombs.

Bomb types

Bombs are named according to their shape, which is determined by the fluidity of the magma from which they are formed. 
 Ribbon or cylindrical bombs form from highly to moderately fluid magma, ejected as irregular strings and blobs. The strings break up into small segments which fall to the ground intact and look like ribbons. Hence, the name "ribbon bombs". These bombs are circular or flattened in cross section, are fluted along their length, and have tabular vesicles.
 Spherical bombs also form from high to moderately fluid magma. In the case of spherical bombs, surface tension plays a major role in pulling the ejecta into spheres.
 Spindle, fusiform, or almond/rotational bombs are formed by the same processes as spherical bombs, though the major difference being the partial nature of the spherical shape. Spinning during flight leaves these bombs looking elongated or almond shaped; the spinning theory behind these bombs' development has also given them the name 'fusiform bombs'. Spindle bombs are characterised by longitudinal fluting, one side slightly smoother and broader than the other. This smooth side represents the underside of the bomb as it fell through the air.
 Cow pie bombs are formed when highly fluid magma falls from moderate height, so the bombs do not solidify before impact (they are still liquid when they strike the ground). They consequently flatten or splash and form irregular roundish discs, which resemble cow dung.
 Bread-crust bombs are formed if the outside of the lava bombs solidifies during their flight. They may develop cracked outer surfaces as the interiors continue to expand.
 Cored bombs are bombs that have rinds of lava enclosing a core of previously consolidated lava. The core consists of accessory fragments of an earlier eruption, accidental fragments of country rock (such as xenoliths) or, in rare cases, bits of lava formed earlier during the same eruption.

References

External links

 USGS Volcano Hazards Program
   

Tephra
Volcanic rocks